For information on all Lamar University sports, see Lamar Cardinals and Lady Cardinals

The 1990–91 Lamar Cardinals basketball team represented Lamar University during the 1990–91 NCAA Division I women's basketball season. The Lady Cardinals were led by fifth-year head coach Al Barbre. The team played their home games at the Montagne Center in Beaumont, Texas and were members of the American South Conference. The Lady Cardinals finished the season with a 29–4 overall and a 12–0 conference record. The team qualified for the 1991 NCAA Women's Division I Basketball Tournament winning games against Texas, LSU, and Arkansas. The team lost to eventual tournament championship game participant, Virginia in the Elite Eight.

After the season and probation
Al Barbe was named American South Conference Coach of the Year and Converse District VI Coach of the Year. Brenda Hackett and Urannah Jackson were named as American South Conference First Team players.

Following an NCAA investigation, all wins for the season were vacated due to violations by the program. In addition, the program was placed on two years' probation and the number of allowed scholarships was reduced during the probation period. Al Barbre resigned as head coach.

Roster

Schedule and results

|-
!colspan=9 style="background:#E31937; color:#FFFFFF;"|Regular Season

|-
!colspan=9 style="background:#E31937; color:#FFFFFF;"|American South Tournament

|-
!colspan=9 style="background:#E31937; color:#FFFFFF;"|1991 NCAA Division I Women's Tournament

References

Lamar Lady Cardinals basketball seasons
Lamar
Lamar Lady Cardinals basketball
Lamar Lady Cardinals basketball